McArthur Lake, formerly Clowey Lake, is a lake in the Northwest Territories, Canada. It is on the  Taltson River to the east of Great Slave Lake, and is just south of the tree line. In the past it may have been a center for canoe building.

Geography

The southern extension of the lake connects to Burpee Lake.
It lies just to the south of the tree line.
Campsites in the area typically have small groves of spruce and birch, and there are some jack pines. 
The lake is shallow, so a strong wind can whip up steep waves.
Below the lake there is a series of complex rapids.

History

McArthur Lake seems to be the lake that the explorer Samuel Hearne named "Clowey Lake".
The lake is within Chipewyan territory.
Hearne left Prince of Wales Fort on Hudson Bay on 7 December 1770 with a party of Chipewyan people, aiming to reach the Arctic Ocean by summer. 
He described Dene canoe building at Lake Clowey.
Based on Hearne's account, it seems possible that Slavey and Dogrib Dene people habitually gathered at the lake to build canoes.
It was given its present name on 6 June 1957 in honour of Warrant Officer Edwin Matthew McArthur, 405 Squadron of the Royal Canadian Air Force, who died in action during World War II on 1 September 1943.

River basin

The Taltson River basin has a subhumid, high boreal ecoclimate.
Summers are typically cool and winters are very cold.
The river rises near a series of lakes, including Coventry Lake and Dymond Lake in the northeast of the basin.
It flows north to McArthur Lake, then west to Gray Lake.
From there it flows to the southern shore of Great Slave Lake at the western end of the Simpson Island chain.

Geology

The McCann–McArthur Lake region is in the southwestern Rae Craton.
The lake lies in the McCann domain just southeast of the northeast-trending Penylan domain.

Fish

A 2014 analysis of mercury in twenty specimens of lake trout found that 75% were over the commercial guideline and 100% over the frequent consumption guideline. 
Analysis of four specimens of lake whitefish found that all were within the guidelines.

Notes

Sources

Lakes of the Northwest Territories